Nieuwerkerken is a municipality located in the Belgian province of Limburg near Hasselt. On January 1, 2006, Nieuwerkerken had a total population of 6,606. The total area is 22.46 km² which gives a population density of 294 inhabitants per km². It consists of 4 villages: Binderveld, Wijer, Kozen and Nieuwerkerken. The current mayor is Dries Deferm (CD&V - Christian Democrats).

The municipality consists of the following sub-municipalities: Binderveld, Kozen, Nieuwerkerken proper, and Wijer.

The village of Wijer was the location for the first series of the television show De Werf (VTM).

Attractions
Main monuments:
 St Peter's Church (1910)
 Castle (farm) of Nieuwerkerken (1648)
 Castle Schelfstad Heath (18th century)
 Heath Schelfstad Mining (18th century)

References

External links
 
Official website - Only available in Dutch

Municipalities of Limburg (Belgium)